Sharav may refer to:

As a family name
 Eden Sharav (born 1992), a Scottish professional snooker player

As a Mongolian given name
 Byambasuren Sharav (born 1952), a modern Mongolian composer
 Marzan Sharav (1869–1939), a Mongolian painter

As a Mongolian patronymic
 Sharav Nasanjargal (born 1968), a Mongolian international footballer
 Sharavyn Gungaadorj (born 1935), a Mongolian politician and 15th Prime Minister of Mongolia

Other uses
 Khamsin, a local wind in North Africa and the Arabian Peninsula, known as sharav (שרב) in Hebrew